The Carriage of Goods By Sea Act 1992 is a UK Statute regarding bills for the lading of goods onto ships. It repealed the Bills of Lading Act 1855  and made new provisions.

Background to the Act
The Bills of Lading Act 1855 was commendably brief and proved useful, but as time went by certain defects became apparent. The English courts devised some ways round the problem: in Brandt v Liverpool 1924  the concept of implied contracts was developed. Nevertheless, there were difficulties relating to passing of property and passing of risk.

The Law Commission and the Scottish Law Commission addressed the issue in a report, "Rights of Suit in respect of Carriage of Goods by Sea". The Report contained a draft bill which Parliament adopted in full without amendment.<ref>Except that, for obvious reasons, the proposed short title was changed from "Carriage of Goods by Sea Act 1991 to " ~~~ 1992"</ref>

The Act's provisions
The statute makes provision for Bills of Lading and other documents of carriage, as follows:
s.1:	The CoGSA 1992 now applies to: bills of lading,  sea waybills, and ship's delivery orders. A bill of lading must be negotiable, and includes a "received for shipment" bill.
s.1 also empowers the Minister to make regulatory provision (by way of a Statutory Instrument) in respect of electronic transactions and electronic bills of lading.
s.2:	A person who becomes the lawful holder of a bill of lading (or sea waybill, or delivery order) shall have transferred to and vested in him all rights of suit under the contract of carriage as if he had been a party to the contract.
s.3:	Where such a person (s.2) takes or demands delivery of the goods (or makes a cargo claim), that person becomes subject to the same liabilities under that contract as if he had been a party to that contract.
s.4:	A bill of lading which represents goods to have been shipped, and which is signed by the ship's master or his agent is conclusive evidence of receipt for shipment.
(s.4 quashes the rule in Grant v Norway 1851).

Bills of Lading

A bill of lading serves three main functions: 
  it is a conclusive receipt, i.e. an acknowledgement that the goods have been loaded; 
 it contains or evidences the terms of the contract of carriage; and 
 it serves as a document of title to the goods, subject to the nemo dat quod non habet'' rule.

Although the term "bill of lading" is well known and well understood, it may become obsolete.  Articles 1:15 & 1:16 of the Rotterdam Rules create the new term "transport document"; but (assuming the Rules come into force) it remains to be seen whether shippers, carriers and "maritime performing parties" (another new Rotterdam Rules coinage) will abandon the long-established and familiar term, "bill of lading".

The Carriage of Goods By Sea Act 1971 
The Carriage of Goods by Sea Act 1971 incorporates the Hague-Visby Rules into English Law. These rules require (where the Article X invokes the Rules) that, on demand, the carrier must provide the shipper with a bill of lading that meets the requirements of Article III. Although CoGSA 1992 cannot amend the Hague-Visby Rules, which are an International Convention, s.4 of the 1992 Act (above) upgrades the status of a bill of lading to be conclusive evidence of receipt for shipment.

See also
 Seaworthiness (law)

References

Merchant ships
United Kingdom Acts of Parliament 1992
Shipping in the United Kingdom
International trade law